George Willis Cooke (1848–1923) was a Unitarian minister, writer, editor and lecturer. He is best known for Unitarianism in America, his history of that movement in the 19th century, and for his work on Transcendentalist writers and publications.

Biography
George Willis Cooke was born in Comstock, Michigan on April 23, 1848.

He died in Revere, Massachusetts on April 30, 1923.

Works
Further works, published online, are available from University of Pennsylvania and from Google books.
  Online publication
 
 
 
 
 
  Online publication

Literature

See also
 History of Unitarianism

References

External links 
 
 

1848 births
1923 deaths
American Unitarians
Unitarianism
People from Kalamazoo County, Michigan